Brian McConnachie (born December 23, 1942) is an American actor, comedy writer, and children's book author. In 1982, he won an Emmy Award as part of the writing team for SCTV Network, and in 1979 he was nominated for an Emmy as part of the writing team for Saturday Night Live.

During the early 1970s, he was one of the main writers for National Lampoon, where he authored and co-authored many articles. He left the magazine after four years, but as Rick Meyerowitz commented in the book Drunk Stoned Brilliant Dead in 2010,

"...[McConnachie's Lampoon work] is well loved, here on Earth, and on his home planet."

As an actor, McConnachie has appeared in 15 films. As a television writer, in addition to SCTV Network and Saturday Night Live, he has also written fifteen episodes of Noddy and eighteen of Shining Time Station.

Filmography
The TVTV Show (1977)
Saturday Night Live (1978-1979)
SCTV Network (1981)
Encyclopedia (1988)
Shining Time Station (1989-1993)
Earthday Birthday (1990) 
Shining Time Station: 'Tis a Gift (1990)
Shining Time Station: Second Chances (1995)
Shining Time Station: One of the Family (1995)
Noddy (1998)
The Simpsons (2013)

Bibliography
National Lampoon (1973-1977)
The Job of Sex: A Working Man's Guide to Productive Lovemaking (1974)
The Naked and The Nude: Hollywood and Beyond (1977)
The American Bystander (1983)
Lily of the Forest (with Jack Ziegler) (1987)
Blowing Smoke: The Wild and Whimsical World of Cigars (1997)

Acting
This is a list of films that McConnachie has appeared in, and the roles he played in those films.
 People I Know (2002) – Jamie Hoff
 The Curse of the Jade Scorpion (2001) – Voltan's Participant
 Small Time Crooks (2000) – Paul Milton
 Celebrity (1998) – Exercise Tape Fan
 Deconstructing Harry (1997) – Dr. Reese
 Don't Drink the Water (TV film) (1994) – Washington Reporter
 Bullets Over Broadway (1994) – Mitch Sabine
 Six Degrees of Separation (1993) – Mrs. Bannister's Guest
 Sleepless in Seattle (1993) – Bob
 Husbands and Wives (1992) – Rain's Father
 Quick Change (1990) – Bank Manager
 The Adventures of Bob & Doug McKenzie: Strange Brew (1983) – Ted
 Caddyshack (1980) – Drew Scott
 Mr. Mike's Mondo Video (1979) – "LaserBra 2000" Scientist

See also

Further reading
 Drunk Stoned Brilliant Dead: The Artists and Writers who made National Lampoon Insanely Great, 2010, Rick Meyerowitz, Abrams Books, New York,

External links

Living people
American humorists
American satirists
American parodists
Parody novelists
American satirical novelists
1942 births
Emmy Award winners
National Lampoon people